Paul Woods (28 October 1950 – ) was a Welsh rugby union and professional rugby league footballer who played in the 1970s and 1980s, and rugby union coach.

Background
Paul Woods was born in Pontllanfraith, Wales, and he died aged 57 of leukaemia in Abergavenny, Wales.

Playing career

International honours
Paul Woods won 10 caps for Wales (RL) in 1977–1981 while at Widnes, Rochdale Hornets, and Hull 13-goals 26-points.

Challenge Cup Final appearances
Paul Woods played  in Hull FC's 5-10 defeat by Hull Kingston Rovers in the 1980 Challenge Cup Final during the 1979–80 season at Wembley Stadium, London on Saturday 3 May 1980, in front of a crowd of 95,000.

BBC2 Floodlit Trophy Final appearances
Paul Woods played  in Hull FC's 13-3 victory over Hull Kingston Rovers in the 1979 BBC2 Floodlit Trophy Final during the 1979-80 season at The Boulevard, Kingston upon Hull on Tuesday 18 December 1979.

Player's No.6 Trophy Final appearances
Paul Woods played , i.e. number 5, and scored 2-drop goals in Widnes' 4-9 defeat by Warrington in the 1977–78 Players No.6 Trophy Final during the 1977–78 season at Knowsley Road, St. Helens on Saturday 28 January 1978

References

External links
Statistics at rugby.widnes.tv
 (archived by web.archive.org) Stats – PastPlayers – W at hullfc.com
 (archived by web.archive.org) Profile at hullfc.com

1950 births
2007 deaths
Cardiff City Blue Dragons players
Footballers who switched code
Hull F.C. players
Liverpool City (rugby league) players
Pontypool RFC players
Rochdale Hornets players
Rugby league five-eighths
Rugby league fullbacks
Rugby league halfbacks
Rugby league players from Caerphilly County Borough
Rugby union players from Caerphilly County Borough
Tredegar RFC players
Wales national rugby league team players
Welsh rugby league players
Welsh rugby union coaches
Welsh rugby union players
Widnes Vikings players